Testis specific serine kinase 1B is a protein that in humans is encoded by the TSSK1B gene.

Function

TSSK1 belongs to a family of serine/threonine kinases highly expressed in testis (Hao et al., 2004 [PubMed 15044604]).[supplied by OMIM, Mar 2008].

References

Further reading